The 4th Gemini Awards were held in 1989 to honour achievements in Canadian television. It was broadcast on CBC.

Awards

Best Comedy Program or Series
 Codco

Best Variety Program or Series
 The Comedy Mill
 Pilot One
 The Tommy Hunter Show

Best Dramatic Series
 Degrassi Junior High
 9B
 Danger Bay
 Street Legal

Best Dramatic Mini Series
 Glory! Glory!
 Glory Enough for All
 Passion and Paradise

Best TV Movie
 The Squamish Five
 Two Men

Best Information Program or Series
 The Journal
 Midday
 Monitor
 The Fifth Estate

Best Children's Series
 Mr. Dressup
 Bob Schneider & The Rainbow Kids
 Happy Castle

Best Writing in a Dramatic Program
 Night Heat
 Diamonds
 Friday the 13th: The Series
 My Secret Identity

Best Writing in a Comedy or Variety Program or Series
 The Kids in the Hall
 Codco
 The Comedy Mill

Best Direction in a Dramatic Series or Comedy Series
 Diamonds
 9B
 Friday the 13th: The Series
 The Beachcombers

Best Performance by a Lead Actor in a Continuing Dramatic Series
 Eric Peterson, Street Legal
 Stefan Brogren, Degrassi Junior High
 Robert Clothier, The Beachcombers
 Derek McGrath, My Secret Identity
 Robert Wisden, 9B

Best Performance by a Lead Actress in a Continuing Dramatic Series
 Stacie Mistysyn, Degrassi Junior High
 Alex Amini, T. and T.
 Janet-Laine Green, The Beachcombers
 Dixie Seatle, Adderly
 Joanne Vannicola, 9B

Best Performance by a Broadcast Journalist
 Tom Kennedy
 John Burke
 Jim Munson
 Kas Roussy
 Roger Smith

Best Performance by a Host, Interviewer or Anchor
 Peter Mansbridge
 Hana Gartner
 Valerie Pringle
 Lloyd Robertson

Earle Grey Award
 Sean McCann

TV Guide's Most Popular Program Award
 The Journal

04
Gemini Awards, 1989
Gemini Awards, 1989